An action role-playing game (often abbreviated action RPG or ARPG) is a subgenre of video games that combines core elements from both the action game and role-playing genre.

Definition 
The games emphasize real-time combat where the player has direct control over the characters as opposed to turn or menu-based combat while still having a focus on character's Stats in order to determine relative strength and abilities. These games often use action game combat systems similar to hack and slash or shooter games. Action role-playing games may also incorporate action-adventure games, which include a mission system and role-playing game mechanics, or MMORPGs with real-time combat systems.

History

1970s and early 1980s

Allgame listed the following games released prior to 1984 as action RPGs: Temple of Apshai (1979) and its sequel Gateway to Apshai (1983), Beneath the Pyramids for the Apple II (1980), Bokosuka Wars (1983), and Sword of Fargoal (1983). Jeremy Parish of USgamer claimed that Adventure (1980) was an action RPG. Bill Loguidice and Matt Barton claimed that the Intellivision games Advanced Dungeons & Dragons (1982) and Treasure of Tarmin (1983) were action RPGs. Shaun Musgrave of TouchArcade notes that Adventure lacked RPG mechanics such as experience points and permanent character growth, and argues that Gateway to Apshai is "the earliest game I'd feel comfortable calling an action-RPG" but notes that "it doesn't fit neatly into our modern genre classifications", though came closer than Bokosuka Wars released the same year.

Jeremy Parish of 1UP.com argues that Japanese developers created a new brand of action role-playing game; these new Japanese games combined the role-playing genre with arcade-style action and action-adventure elements. Shaun Musgrave of TouchArcade also traces the genre's roots to Japan, noting that the "Western game industry of the time had a tendency to treat action games and RPGs as separate things for separate demographics".

Jeremy Parish argues that action RPGs were popularized in Japan by The Tower of Druaga. It was released for arcades in June 1984, and was intended as a "fantasy version of Pac-Man, with puzzles to solve, monsters to battle, and hidden treasure to find". Its success in Japan inspired the development of Dragon Slayer (1984) and Hydlide (1984). Dragon Slayer, Hydlide and Courageous Perseus (1984) "vie for position as genre precedent" according to John Szczepaniak, and there was an ongoing rivalry developing between the Dragon Slayer and Hydlide series over the years. The Tower of Druaga, Dragon Slayer and Hydlide were influential in Japan, where they influenced later action RPGs such as Ys, as well as The Legend of Zelda.

Falcom's Dragon Slayer, created by Yoshio Kiya, is "the very first action-RPG ever made" according to GameSetWatch. Originally released for the PC-8801 computer in September 1984, it abandoned the command-based battles of earlier role-playing games in favor of real-time hack-and-slash combat that required direct input from the player, alongside puzzle-solving elements. In contrast to earlier turn-based roguelikes, Dragon Slayer was a dungeon-crawl role-playing game using real-time, action-oriented combat, combined with traditional role-playing mechanics.  Dragon Slayer's overhead action role-playing formula was used in many later games.

T&E Soft's Hydlide, released in December 1984, was created by Tokihiro Naito, who was influenced by The Tower of Druaga. It was the first action RPG with an overworld. The game was immensely popular in Japan, selling 2 million copies across all platforms. According to John Szczepaniak, it "cannot be overstated how influential Hydlide was on the ARPGs which followed it". The same year, Courageous Perseus was also one of the earliest action RPGs.

Dragon Slayer II: Xanadu, released in 1985 (billed as a "new type of real-time role-playing game"), was an action role-playing game including many character stats and a large quest. It also incorporated a side-scrolling view during exploration and an overhead view during battle, and an early "Karma" morality system where the character's Karma meter will rise if he commits sin (killing "good" enemies), which in turn causes the temples to refuse to level him up. Xanadu Scenario II, released in 1986, was an expansion pack, created to expand the content of Dragon Slayer II: Xanadu. Hydlide II: Shine of Darkness (1985) also featured a morality system. Eurogamer cites Fairlight (1985) as an early action RPG.

Late 1980s

An important influence on the action RPG genre was the 1986 action-adventure The Legend of Zelda, which served as the template for many future action RPGs, even though it does not strictly fit the definition of later action RPGs. In contrast to previous action RPGs, such as Dragon Slayer and Hydlide, which required the player to bump into enemies in order to attack them, The Legend of Zelda featured an attack button that animates a sword swing or projectile attack on the screen. It was also an early example of open-world, nonlinear gameplay, and introduced new features such as battery backup saving. These elements have been used in many action RPGs since.

In 1987, Zelda II: The Adventure of Link implemented a more traditional RPG-esque system, including experience points and levels with action game elements. Unlike its predecessor, Zelda II more closely fits the definition of an action RPG.

Another Metroidvania-style action RPG released that year was System Sacom's Sharp X1 computer game Euphory, which was possibly the only Metroidvania-style multiplayer action RPG produced, allowing two-player cooperative gameplay. The fifth Dragon Slayer title, Sorcerian, was also released that year. It was a party-based action RPG, with the player controlling a party of four characters at the same time in a side-scrolling view. The game also featured character creation, highly customizable characters, class-based puzzles, and a new scenario system, allowing players to choose from 15 scenarios, or quests, to play through in the order of their choice. It was also an episodic video game, with expansion disks later released offering more scenarios. Falcom also released the first installment of its Ys series in 1987. While not very popular in the West, the long-running Ys series has performed strongly in the Japanese market, with many sequels, remakes and ports in the decades that followed its release. Besides Falcom's own Dragon Slayer series, Ys was also influenced by Hydlide, from which it borrowed certain mechanics such as health-regeneration.

The Faery Tale Adventure offered one of the largest worlds at the time, with over 17,000 computer screens without loading times.

In 1988, Telenet Japan's Exile series debuted, and was controversial due to its plot, which revolves around a time-traveling Crusades-era Syrian assassin who assassinates various religious/historical figures as well as 20th-century political leaders, The gameplay of Exile included both overhead exploration and side-scrolling combat, and featured a heart monitor to represent the player's Attack Power and Armor Class statistics. Another controversial aspect of the game involved taking drugs (instead of potions) that increase/decrease attributes, but with side effects such as heart-rate increase/decrease or death. Origin Systems, the developer of the Ultima series, also released an action RPG in 1988, titled Times of Lore, which was inspired by various NES titles, particularly The Legend of Zelda. Times of Lore inspired several later titles by Origin Systems, such as the 1990 games Bad Blood (another action RPG based on the same engine) and Ultima VI: The False Prophet, based on the same interface.

Also in 1989, the enhanced remake Ys I & II was one of the first video games to use CD-ROM, which was utilized to provide enhanced graphics, animated cut scenes, a Red Book CD soundtrack, and voice acting. Its English localization was also one of the first to use voice dubbing. The game received the Game of the Year award from OMNI Magazine in 1990, as well as other prizes. Another 1989 release, Activision's Prophecy: The Fall of Trinadon, attempted to introduce "Nintendo-style" action combat to North American computer role-playing games.

1990s
Action RPGs were far more common on consoles than computers, due to gamepads being better suited to real-time action than the keyboard and mouse. Though there were attempts at creating action-oriented computer RPGs during the late 1980s and early 1990s, very few saw any success. Times of Lore was one of the more successful attempts in the American computer market, where there was a generally negative attitude towards combining genres in this way and more of an emphasis on preserving the purity of the RPG genre. For example, a 1991 issue of Computer Gaming World criticized several computer role-playing games for using "arcade" or "Nintendo-style" action combat, including Ys, Sorcerian, Times of Lore, and Prophecy.

In 1991, Square released Seiken Densetsu: Final Fantasy Gaiden, also known as Final Fantasy Adventure or Mystic Quest in the West, for the Game Boy. Like Crystalis, the action in Seiken Densetsu bore a strong resemblance to that of Legend of Zelda, but added more RPG elements. It was one of the first action RPGs to allow players to kill townspeople, though later Mana games removed this feature. Arcus Odyssey by Wolf Team (now Namco Tales Studio) was an action RPG that featured an isometric perspective and co-operative multiplayer gameplay.

In 1993, the second Seiken Densetsu game, Secret of Mana, received considerable acclaim, for its innovative pausable real-time action battle system, and its innovative cooperative multiplayer gameplay, where the second or third players could drop in and out of the game at any time, rather than players having to join the game at the same time. The game has remained influential through to the present day, with its ring menu system still used in modern games and its cooperative multiplayer mentioned as an influence on games such as Dungeon Siege III (2011).

Most other such games, however, used a side-scrolling perspective typical of beat 'em ups, such as the Princess Crown series, including Odin Sphere and Muramasa: The Demon Blade. Princess Crown had a more cartoon-like visual appeal. It still had quality visuals due to the George Kamitani style.

LandStalker's 1997 spiritual successor Alundra is considered "one of the finest examples of action/RPG gaming", combining platforming elements and challenging puzzles with an innovative storyline revolving around entering people's dreams and dealing with mature themes.

2000s
Ultima Underworld'''s influence has been found in BioShock (2007), and that game's designer, Ken Levine, has stated that "all the things that I wanted to do and all the games that I ended up working on came out of the inspiration I took from [Ultima Underworld]". Gears of War designer Cliff Bleszinski also cited it as an early influence, stating that it had "far more impact on me than Doom". Other games influenced by Ultima Underworld include The Elder Scrolls: Arena, Deus Ex, Deus Ex: Invisible War, Vampire: The Masquerade – Bloodlines, and Half-Life 2.

FromSoftware's Demon's Souls (2009) emphasized unforgiving enemies and environments, combined with risk-and-reward mechanics such as limited checkpoints, collecting "souls" that can be consumed as experience points to increase the player's stats, or as a currency to purchase items, and penalizing player deaths without imposing an outright failure state. It also incorporated online features allowing players to leave messages in the overworld that can be read by other players, to temporarily join other players' sessions to assist them cooperatively, or "invade" another player's session to engage in player versus player combat. Especially after the release of its spiritual successor Dark Souls (2011) and its sequels, other action RPGs emerged in the 2010s that incorporated mechanics influenced by those of Demon's Souls, which have been popularly referred to as "Soulslike" games.

2010s
In 2013, Vanillaware released the fantasy beat 'em up ARPG Dragon's Crown, a spiritual successor to Princess Crown and a "deeply moving product" of Vanillaware director George Kamitani. Kamitani cites many classic RPGs as his inspiration, stating in the Dragon's Crown Artworks foreword: "The motif within Dragon's Crown is all the fantasy works that has affected me until now: the PC RPG Wizardry that I first came into contact with as a student; Ian Livingstone's gamebooks; games like Tower of Druaga, Golden Axe and The King of Dragons." He also cites his early 20s work on Dungeons & Dragons: Tower of Doom as "truly something that I had aspired for". Dragon's Crown was re-released with a PS4 "Pro" edition in 2018.Assassin's Creed, a long-running Ubisoft franchise, also shifted towards the action RPG formula, inspired by the successes of The Witcher 3 and the Dark Souls series, with its titles Origins (2017), Odyssey (2018) and Valhalla (2020).

Subgenres

First-person dungeon crawl

In late 1987, FTL Games released Dungeon Master, a dungeon crawler that had a real-time game world and some real-time combat elements (akin to Active Time Battle), requiring players to quickly issue orders to the characters, setting the standard for first-person computer RPGs for several years. It inspired many other developers to make real-time dungeon crawlers, such as Eye of the Beholder and Lands of Lore: The Throne of Chaos.Ultima Underworld: The Stygian Abyss, released in 1992, has been cited as the first RPG to feature first-person action in a 3D environment. Ultima Underworld is considered the first example of an immersive sim, a genre that combines elements from other genres to create a game with strong player agency and emergent gameplay, and has influenced many games since its release. The engine was re-used and enhanced for Ultima Underworlds 1993 sequel, Ultima Underworld II: Labyrinth of Worlds. Looking Glass Studios planned to create a third Ultima Underworld, but Origin rejected their pitches. After Electronic Arts (EA) rejected Arkane Studios' pitch for Ultima Underworld III, the studio instead created a spiritual successor: Arx Fatalis. Toby Gard stated that, when designing Tomb Raider, he "was a big fan of ... Ultima Underworld and I wanted to mix that type of game with the sort of polygon characters that were just being showcased in Virtua Fighter". Ultima Underworld was also the basis for Looking Glass Technologies' later System Shock.

 Isometric/top-down dungeon crawler 

The 1988 Origin Systems title Times of Lore was an action RPG with an icon-based point-and-click interface. Bad Blood, another Origin Systems game from 1990, would use the same interface. The designers were inspired by console titles, particularly The Legend of Zelda, to make their interface more accessible. The 1994 title Ultima VIII used mouse controls and attempted to add precision jumping sequences reminiscent of a Mario platform game, though reactions to the game's mouse-based combat were mixed. In 1997 Blizzard's Diablo was released and became massively successful. It was an action RPG that used a mouse oriented point-and-click interface and offered gamers a free online service to play with others that maintained the same rules and gameplay.Diablos effect on the market was significant, inspiring many imitators. Its impact was such that the term "action RPG" has come to be more commonly used for Diablo-style games, with The Legend of Zelda itself slowly recategorized as an action-adventure. Very commonly, these games used a fixed-camera isometric view of the game world, a necessity of the limitations of 2D graphics of early computers; even with 3D graphic engines, such point-and-click games are still presented from a similar isometric view, though providing options to rotate, pan, and zoom the camera to some degree. As such, these are often grouped with other "isometric RPGs".

The popularity of The Diablo series spawned such franchises like Divinity, Torchlight, Dungeon Siege and Sacred. Commonly, these games used a fixed-camera isometric view of the game world, a necessity of the limitations of 2D graphics of early computers; The Diablo series spawned many terms like being referred to as "dungeon crawler" "slasher RPG" "hack and slasher", the series was also heavily criticized by players and media for not being a proper RPG due to it being focused more on fighting enemies and creating character builds than following a proper narrative and dialogue-heavy journey. After its success many other games tried to mix its influences with different structures and narratives, there are multiple games like Divine Divinity that were an attempt to have a more dialogue-heavy experience akin to the Baldurs Gate games and even older series like Falcom's Dragon Slayer/Xanadu series had its outing Xanadu Next with similar Diablo influences. The influences also come full circle when the first Diablo game was inspired by rogue-likes Umoria and Angband  and in more recent years many games in the rogue-like genre are inspired by more classic dungeon crawler ARPGs that Diablo helped spawn.

In this sub genre there are such recent titles as Grim Dawn (2016), Zenonia S: Rifts In Time (2015), Book of Demons (2018), Shadows: Awakening (2018), Snack World: The Dungeon Crawl Gold (2017), Titan Quest: Anniversary Edition (2016) and its expansions Titan Quest: Ragnarök (2017) and Titan Quest: Atlantis (2019), Wolcen: Lords of Mayhem (2020) and Minecraft Dungeons (2020).

 Point and click/target combat 

The prominence of Diablo 2 in the gaming market and its influence on the MMORPG genre  later popularized the strongly used mouse-oriented point and click combat. While in the Diablo series this type of combat does not have a lock-on key, World of Warcraft and most MMO games uses some kind of key to target an enemy, usually TAB, to lock into it, usually referred to as "tab-target". In tab-target combat the player's character automatic do attack animations with some kind of regular attack, while the player can focus on activating other skills and items by pressing other keys. Usually this type of combat is not heavily based on aiming or hit boxes thus the player can hit enemies from different distances and even from a far. Some tab-target MMOs have other targeting options such as an "Action mode".

Role-playing shooter

Shooter-based action RPGs include Strife (1996), System Shock 2 (1999), the Deus Ex series (2000 onwards) by Ion Storm, Bungie's Destiny (2014), Irem's Steambot Chronicles (2005), Square Enix's third-person shooter RPG Dirge of Cerberus: Final Fantasy VII (2006), which introduced an over-the-shoulder perspective similar to Resident Evil 4, and the MMO vehicular combat game Auto Assault (2006) by NetDevil and NCsoft. Other action RPGs featured both hack and slash and shooting elements, with the use of both guns (or in some cases, bow and arrow or aerial combat) and melee weapons, including Cavia's flight-based Drakengard series (2003 to 2005), and Level-5's Rogue Galaxy (2005).

Other RPS games include the Mass Effect series (2007 onwards), Fallout 3 and subsequent Fallout titles (2008 onwards), White Gold: War in Paradise (2008), and Borderlands (2009). Borderlands developer Gearbox Software has dubbed it as a "role-playing shooter" due to the heavy RPG elements within the game, such as quest-based gameplay and also its character traits and leveling system. Half-Minute Hero (2009) is an RPG shooter featuring self-referential humour and a 30-second time limit for each level and boss encounter. Other action role-playing games with shooter elements include the 2010 titles Alpha Protocol by Obsidian Entertainment and The 3rd Birthday, the third game in the Parasite Eve series, features a unique blend of action RPG, real-time tactical RPG, survival horror and third-person tactical shooter elements. Shooter-based RPGs include Imageepoch's post-apocalyptic Black Rock Shooter (2011), which employs both first-person and third-person shooter elements, and Square Enix's Final Fantasy XV (2016), which features both hack and slash and third-person shooter elements.

The online live service version gained a lot of popularity on the 2010s with titles such as Warframe (2013), Destiny (2014) and Destiny 2 (2017), Anthem (2019), The Division (2016) and The Division 2'' (2019).

Soulslike

References

 
Articles containing video clips
Video game genres